Juli Zeh (Julia Barbara Finck, née Zeh; born 30 June 1974 in Bonn) is a German writer and former  judge.

Biography
Her first book was Adler und Engel (translated into English as Eagles and Angels by Christine Slenczka), which won the 2002 Deutscher Bücherpreis for best debut novel. She traveled through Bosnia-Herzegovina in 2001, which became the basis for the book Die Stille ist ein Geräusch. Her other books are Das Land der Menschen, Schilf (translated into English as Dark Matter by Christine Lo), Alles auf dem Rasen, Kleines Konversationslexikon für Haushunde, Spieltrieb, Ein Hund läuft durch die Republik, Nullzeit and Corpus Delicti (translated into English as The Method by Sally-Ann Spencer).

Zeh lived in Leipzig from 1995, and currently resides outside Berlin. Zeh studied law in Passau and Leipzig, passing the Zweites Juristisches Staatsexamen – comparable equivalent to the U.S. bar exam – in 2003, and holds a doctorate in international law from Universität Saarbrücken. Since January 2019, she is an honorary judge at the constitutional court of the state of Brandenburg. She also has a degree from the Deutsches Literaturinstitut Leipzig.

Zeh was one of the first signers of the Open letter on the German position regarding the Russian invasion of Ukraine in April 2022, who demanded not to support Ukraine with arms in order to "prevent a third world war".

Zeh is married and has two children.

Bibliography
Novels

Other

References

Further reading

External links

 An interview about her social commitment, recent translated books and her recent play, Corpus Delicti, Trouw, September 2008 
 Interview about Corpus Delicti, the role of state observation and civil disobedience, April 2011 
 Article about the translation of Corpus Delicti as The Method, April 2012
 Juli Zeh in: NRW Literatur im Netz 

1974 births
Living people
Studienstiftung alumni
German women novelists
21st-century German novelists
21st-century German women writers
Scientists from Bonn
Recipients of the Cross of the Order of Merit of the Federal Republic of Germany